Silverado High School may refer to:

Silverado High School (Mission Viejo), California, United States
Silverado High School (Victorville), California, United States
Silverado High School (Paradise, Nevada), Nevada, United States